Luis Miranda may refer to:
Luis Miranda (painter) (1932–2016), Ecuadorian painter
Luis Miranda (politician), Canadian politician
Luis A. Miranda Jr., New York political activist
Luis Miranda (footballer), Colombian footballer

See also
Luis Miranda Casañas, Puerto Rican businessman
Luis de Miranda (born 1971), novelist, philosopher, editor, and film director